Virginia Valli (died September 24, 1968) was an American stage and film actress whose motion picture career started in the silent film era and lasted until the beginning of the sound film era of the 1930s.

Early life
Born Virginia McSweeney in Chicago, Illinois, she got her acting start in Milwaukee with a stock company. She also did some film work with Essanay Studios in Chicago, starting in 1916.

Film career
Valli continued to appear in films throughout the 1920s. She was an established star at the Universal studio by the mid-1920s. In 1924 she was the female lead in King Vidor's southern gothic Wild Oranges, a film now recovered from film vault obscurity. She also appeared in the romantic comedy, Every Woman's Life, about "the man she could have married, the man she should have married and the man she DID marry." Most of her films were made between 1924 and 1927, and included Alfred Hitchcock's debut feature, The Pleasure Garden (1925), Paid to Love (1927), with William Powell, and Evening Clothes (1927), which featured Adolphe Menjou. In 1925 Valli performed in The Man Who Found Himself with Thomas Meighan.

Her first sound picture was The Isle of Lost Ships with Jason Robards Sr. and Noah Beery Sr. in 1929. Her last film was in Night Life in Reno, in 1931.

Personal life
Valli was first married to George Lamson and the two shared a bungalow in Hollywood, near the Hollywood Hotel.

In 1931, she married her second husband, actor Charles Farrell. They moved to Palm Springs, where she was a social fixture for many years.

She suffered a stroke in 1966, and died two years later, aged 73, in Palm Springs. She was buried in the Welwood Murray Cemetery of that city. She had no children.

Filmography

 Filling His Own Shoes (1917)
 The Golden Idiot (1917)
 The Fibbers (1917)
 Satan's Private Door (1917)
 Uneasy Money (1918)
 Ruggles of Red Gap (1918)
 His Father's Wife (1919)
 The Black Circle (1919)
 The Very Idea (1920)
 The Dead Line (1920)
 The Midnight Bride (1920)
 The Common Sin (1920)
 The Plunger (1920)
 The Silver Lining (1921)
 Sentimental Tommy (1921)
 The Idle Rich (1921)
 The Man Who (1921)
 A Trip to Paradise (1921)
 The Devil Within (1921)
 Love's Penalty (1921)
 The Right That Failed (1922)
 His Back Against the Wall (1922)
 The Black Bag (1922)
 The Village Blacksmith (1922)
 Tracked to Earth (1922)
 The Storm (1922)
 The Shock (1923)
 A Lady of Quality (1924)
 Wild Oranges (1924)
 The Confidence Man (1924)
 The Signal Tower (1924)
 K – The Unknown (1924)
 In Every Woman's Life (1924)
 The Lady Who Lied (1925)
 The Price of Pleasure (1925)
 The Man Who Found Himself (1925)
 Siege (1925)
 Up the Ladder (1925)
 The Pleasure Garden (1925)
 Watch Your Wife (1926)
 Flames (1926)
 The Family Upstairs (1926)
 Stage Madness (1927)
 Judgment of the Hills (1927)
 Evening Clothes (1927)
 Marriage (1927)
 Paid to Love (1927)
 Ladies Must Dress (1927)
 East Side, West Side (1927)
 The Street of Illusion (1928)
 The Escape (1928)
 The Isle of Lost Ships (1929)
 The Lost Zeppelin (1929)
 Mister Antonio (1929)
 Behind Closed Doors (1929)
 Guilty? (1930)
 Night Life in Reno (1931)

References

Notes

Bibliography
 Elyria, Ohio Chronicle Telegram, Virginia Valli, ex-actress, dies, September 25, 1968, p. 40.
 Madison, Wisconsin Capitol Times, Borne On The Wings Of The Storm Valli – Latest Star On The Movie Horizon, Saturday Afternoon, September 16, 1922, p. 4.
 Oakland, California Tribune, Virginia Valli Starts Work In Eastern Studio, June 21, 1925, p. 75.

External links

 
 
 Virginia Valli at Virtual History
 gallery of still photos from Virginia Valli films(Univ.of Wash, Sayre Collection)

Actresses from Chicago
Actresses from Palm Springs, California
American film actresses
American silent film actresses
Burials at Welwood Murray Cemetery
1968 deaths
20th-century American actresses
1895 births